Katherine Southwell (died 1657) was an English courtier.

She was a daughter of Sir Robert Southwell and Elizabeth Howard, and a granddaughter of Charles Howard, 1st Earl of Nottingham.

She was a gentlewoman in the household of Anne of Denmark, with her sisters Elizabeth Southwell and Frances Southwell.

She died in April 1657.

Marriage and children
She married Greville Verney, 7th Baron Willoughby de Broke in 1618. Their children included:
 Greville Verney, 8th Baron Willoughby de Broke
 Elizabeth Verney, who married William Peyto of Chesterton, son of Edward Peyto
 John Verney
 Richard Verney, 11th Baron Willoughby de Broke

References

Household of Anne of Denmark
17th-century English women
17th-century English people
1657 deaths
Willoughby de Broke
Katherine